The Attila József Prize is an annually awarded Hungarian literary prize for excellence in the field of belles-lettres. It was first resented in 1950 in honour of the poet Attila József. Another major Hungarian literary prize is the Kossuth Prize.

Prizewinners
For a complete list of prizewinners see listing at the Hungarian Wikipedia
Some notable prizewinners include:
László Németh 1951
Géza Képes 1952 
Sándor Dallos 1953
Lajos Áprily 1954
Magda Szabó 1959 and 1972
Sándor Csoóri 1954
István Fekete 1960
Margit Szécsi  1960 
Endre Illés (hu) 1963 
Endre Fejes 1963
Béla Vihar 1966
János Pilinszky 1971
Menyhért Lakatos 1976
Miklós Szentkuthy 1977
Ágnes Gergely 1977 and 1987
Anna Dániel 1983
Zsuzsa Rakovszky 1987
Menyhért Lakatos 1993
Zsófia Balla (1996)
Attila Bartis (2005)
Zsófia Bán 2008
Attila György (2011)

References

Hungarian literary awards
Awards established in 1950
1950 establishments in Hungary